Hendrik Joubert (born 15 May 1949) is a South African cricketer. He played in three first-class matches for Boland in 1984/85 and 1985/86.

See also
 List of Boland representative cricketers

References

External links
 

1949 births
Living people
South African cricketers
Boland cricketers
Cricketers from Bellville, South Africa